Bagisara oula is a species of moth in the family Noctuidae (the owlet moths). It is found in North America.

The MONA or Hodges number for Bagisara oula is 9173.

References

Further reading

 
 
 

Bagisarinae
Articles created by Qbugbot
Moths described in 1913